Moody International Ltd. provided technical services to reduce risk in the petroleum industry, amongst others.

On April 28, 2011, the company was acquired by Intertek for £450 million. At that time, the company had over 2,500 employees and 80 offices in 60 countries.

History
The company was founded in the United States in 1911.

In 1948, the company opened an office in Japan, its first international office.

The company opened an office in United Arab Emirates, its first office in the Middle East, in 1986. It opened offices in China in 1993 and Baku in 1996.

In 2007, the company was acquired by Investcorp of Bahrain for £192 million.

On April 28, 2011, the company was acquired by Intertek for £450 million.

References

2011 disestablishments in England
Business services companies established in 1911
British companies disestablished in 2011
Defunct energy companies of the United Kingdom
American companies established in 1911